Raise the Roof is the second collaborative studio album by British singer-songwriter Robert Plant and American bluegrass-country singer and violinist Alison Krauss. The album was released on November 19, 2021, by Rounder Records and Concord Records in the United States and Warner Music for the rest of the world. The album was nominated for three Grammy Awards at the 65th Annual Grammy Awards, including Best Americana Album, Best American Roots Song for "High and Lonesome," and Best Country Duo/Group Performance for "Going Where the Lonely Go".

Critical reception

Raise the Roof received generally positive reviews from critics. At Metacritic, which assigns a normalized rating out of 100 to reviews from critics, the album received an average score of 83, which indicates "universal acclaim", based on 14 reviews.

Track listing

Personnel
Alison Krauss – Vocals, fiddle
Robert Plant – Vocals

Additional musicians
Bill Frisell – Acoustic guitar, electric guitar
David Hidalgo – Acoustic guitar, electric guitar, jarana
Marc Ribot – Acoustic guitar, banjo, dobro, electric guitar, bass guitar
Colin Linden - Dobro
Buddy Miller – Electric mandolin, guitar
Russ Pahl - Pedal steel guitar, guitar, bass guitar
Stuart Duncan – Banjo, cello, fiddle, mandolin
T Bone Burnett - Six-string bass, composer, acoustic and electric guitars, Mellotron, producer, vocal harmony, backing vocals
Dennis Crouch – Upright bass
Viktor Krauss - Upright bass, Mellotron
Jeff Taylor - Bass accordion, dolceola, Marxophone, piano
Lucinda Williams - Background vocals
Jay Bellerose – Drums

Production
T Bone Burnett – Production
 Michael Piersante  – Recording and Mixing
Richard Evans – Design & Art

Charts

Weekly charts

Year-end charts

Certifications and sales

References

2021 albums
Albums produced by T Bone Burnett
Concord Records albums
Covers albums
Folk rock albums by American artists
Folk rock albums by British artists
Robert Plant albums
Rounder Records albums
Vocal duet albums
Sequel albums